Ben Williams (born 24 June 1992) is an English banker and former first-class cricketer.

Williams was born in June 1992 at Whiston, Lancashire. He was educated initially at the Wade Deacon High School in Widnes, before attending Shrewsbury School at a sixth form entrant. From Shrewsbury, he went up to Hertford College, Oxford. He played first-class cricket while at Oxford, making his debut for Oxford MCCU against Lancashire at Oxford in 2011. He played first-class cricket while at Oxford until 2013, making six appearances for Oxford MCCU, in addition to playing for Oxford University against Cambridge University in The University Matches of 2011, 2012 and 2013. In nine first-class matches, Williams scored 399 runs at an average of 30.69, with a high score of 92. In September 2011, he was twelfth man for England during the Third Test of their series against India.

After graduating from Oxford, Williams moved into the financial industry and is currently employed by Morgan Stanley.

Notes and references

External links

1992 births
Living people
People from Whiston, Merseyside
People educated at Shrewsbury School
Alumni of Hertford College, Oxford
English cricketers
Oxford MCCU cricketers
Oxford University cricketers
English bankers
Morgan Stanley employees